The Malhamspitzen (originally called the Malchamspitze by Carl Sonklar) are the four peaks of a mighty massif on the Maurerkamm, an Alpine mountain chain in the Venediger Group in Austria's High Tauern National Park. They rise south of the Reggentörl and are only separated from one another by small cols. The literature distinguishes them as follows:
 Nördliche Malhamspitze, north top,
 Mittlere Malhamspitze, middle top,
 Südliche Malhamspitze, south top,
 Südlichste Malhamspitze, southernmost top
The Malhamhorn also belongs to the group.

Location and area 
The Malhamspitzen are surrounded by glaciers. To the west of the north-south crest of the Malhamspitzen lies the Gubachkees, which drains into the River Isel; to the east, feeding the Maurerbach, are the Südliche Malhamkees (also: Böses Wandkees) and the lower-lying Nördliche Malhamkees which has melted drastically in recent years.

Ascent 
The four peaks were first climbed on 12 July 1873 by Prague Alpinist, Victor Hecht, and mountain guide, Johann Außerhofer along the west side from the Clara Hut and over the Umbalgletscher glacier. At that time Hecht only distinguished four summits.

The route runs over the southern part of the Simonykees glacier from the Essener-Rostocker Hut and over the Reggentörl towards the west and continues over the expansive Umbalkees, then follows the Isel stream to the Clara Hut.

References

Literature and maps 
Willi End: Alpine Club Guide Venedigergruppe, Bergverlag Rother, Munich, 2006, .
Alpine Club map 1:25,000 series, Sheet 36, Venedigergruppe, .

Alpine three-thousanders
Mountains of the Alps
Mountains of Tyrol (state)
Venediger Group